Pinus yunnanensis, the Yunnan pine, is a species of conifer in the family Pinaceae. It is found in the Chinese provinces of Yunnan, Sichuan, Guizhou, and Guangxi.

References

yunnanensis
Trees of China
Endemic flora of China
Least concern plants
Taxonomy articles created by Polbot